Belica is a village in the municipality of Kičevo, North Macedonia. It used to be part of the former Drugovo Municipality.

Geography
The village is located in the area of Kopacka region, in the southern part of the territory of the Municipality of Kičevo, on the south side of the Kičevo Valley, whose area rises on the eastern slope of Ilinska Mountain and touches the area of the Municipality of Debarca. The village is hilly, at an altitude of 760 meters. It is 21 kilometers away from the city of Kičevo.

Belica is located in the extreme southern part of the Kičevo Valley. It is located in the upper course of the Belicka River, a right tributary of Treska. Belicka is formed by the confluence of two smaller rivers, Gorna and Temna. Gorna Reka flows from the southeast side, and Temen Dol from the southwest side. With the river valley, the village is open to the north. On the other side it is surrounded by forest parts. 

Belica is quite rich in water and despite the numerous springs, there are hot springs on two rivers that flow into one and form the Belicka River which flows into the Velika Reka near the village of Drugovo. The area of the village Belica borders the areas of the following villages: from the west and southwest with the villages Mramorec and Slatino, from the south with Prostran̂е, from the north and northeast with Kozica and Kladnik, and from the east of the villages Malo Crsko and the larger Golemo Crsko.

Economy
The area is very large and covers 31 km². It is dominated by forests on an area of 2,112.9 hectares, pastures account for 698.1 hectares, and arable land 243.7 hectares.

The village basically has a mixed agricultural function.

The region where Belica is located has a pleasant temperate continental climate favorable for growing numerous crops, the most common of which are corn and potatoes. This climate is pleasant for fruits such as apples, cherries, plums and more. The region of Belica is rich in forests, of which oak and pine are the most common. In the past the village was quite rich with sheep and goats numbering several thousand of which today there are very few left.

Demographics
According to the statistics of Vasil Kanchov from 1900, the village of Belica had 750 inhabitants, all Bulgarians. According to the Bulgarian Exarchate Secretary Dimitar Mišev, in 1905 Belica had 824 inhabitants who belonged to the Bulgarian Exarchate.

Belica was affected by significant depopulation, as the population decreased from 702 inhabitants in 1961 to 115 inhabitants in 1994, Macedonian population. 

According to the 2002 census, the village had a total of 103 inhabitants. Ethnic groups in the village include:

Macedonians 102
Others 1

Culture
Every year during the summer, the "Belica's Meetings" are held, an artistic cultural manifestation where people unite through folk music.

References

Villages in Kičevo Municipality